Pagastia is a genus of non-biting midges in the subfamily Diamesinae of the bloodworm family Chironomidae.

Species
The genus includes the following species:

 P. sequax (Garrett, 1925)
 P. altaica Makarchenko Kerkis & Ivanchenko, 1997
 P. lanceolata (Tokunaga, 1936)
 P. nivis (Tokunaga, 1936)
 P. orientalis (Tshernovskij, 1949)
 P. orthogonia Oliver, 1959
 P. partica (Roback, 1957)

References

Chironomidae